The Battle of Mynydd Hyddgen was a battle between the Welsh and English in June 1401. It was part of the Welsh revolt led by Owain Glyndŵr against English rule that lasted from 1400 to 1415. Its location was on the western slopes of Pumlumon, near the Ceredigion/Powys boundary.

The two armies
The settlers were reinforced by a large force of English soldiers and Flemish mercenaries. This was Owain's early base as his rebellion started and spread. It is estimated that his force at this stage amounted to five hundred men, just a third of the attacking force and some records, such as the 'Annals of Owen Glyn Dwr' written by Gruffydd Hiraethog many years later in 1550 and based on earlier accounts that have not survived, put his force at just 120 men. It is thought that Owain's force would have been made up mostly of archers mounted on hill ponies that would have been well suited for travelling across boggy or mountainous regions.

The English-Flemish army meanwhile would have generally consisted of infantry with some light cavalrymen supporting them. Despite having decent equipment, many of the English-Flemish soldiers were lacking in military experience, and there was a general lack of discipline within their army.

The battle
The precise location of the battle is not known, and little is known of the course of the battle itself. Mynydd means "mountain" in Welsh. However, it is known that Glyndŵr's army was able to fight back these attackers (despite being outnumbered and on the low ground), killing 200, chasing the main force away and making prisoners of the rest. It can be assumed that Owain's success lay in the maneuverability of his light troops. The English army (being more heavily laden) would have had more trouble traversing the marshy ground of the valley.

References

Mynydd Hyddgen
History of Ceredigion
Conflicts in 1401
1401 in Wales
Glyndŵr Rising